La dottoressa del distretto militare (The Lady Medic) is a 1976 commedia sexy all'italiana film directed by Nando Cicero and starring Edwige Fenech.

Plot
The official doctor is temporarily unable to carry out his service at the military hospital, so he is replaced by his sexy assistant (Fenech). The woman should face a parade of young men simulating the most absurd diseases to avoid their conscription.

Cast
Edwige Fenech as Dr. Elena Dogliotti
Alfredo Pea as Gianni Montano
Alvaro Vitali as Alvaro Pappalardo
Carlo Delle Piane as Medical officer
Gianfranco D'Angelo as Dottor Frustalupi
Grazia Di Marzà as Nurse
Alfonso Tomas as Nicola
Renzo Ozzano as Soldier
Angelo Pellegrino as Gay

Release
The film was released in Italy on August 21, 1976.

See also
List of Italian films of 1976

References

External links

1970 films
Commedia sexy all'italiana
Liceale films
1970s sex comedy films
Films scored by Piero Umiliani
1970 comedy films
Films set in Rome
Films shot in Rome
1970s Italian-language films
1970s Italian films